The 1988 Penn Quakers football team was an American football team that represented the University of Pennsylvania during the 1988 NCAA Division I-AA football season. Penn won a share of the Ivy League championship, its fifth of the past six years.

In their third and final year under head coach Ed Zubrow, the Quakers compiled a 9–1 record and outscored opponents 269 to 208. Dan Bauer and Tom Gizzi were the team captains.

Penn's 6–1 conference record tied with Cornell atop the Ivy League standings. The Quakers outscored Ivy opponents 182 to 75. Penn's only loss was to its co-champion, Cornell, in the last week of the year.

Before its last two games, Penn appeared in the weekly top 20 national rankings, at No. 19 in the poll released November 8 and at No. 14 in the poll of November 15. Following the loss to Cornell, Penn dropped out of the rankings, and was not ranked at season's end.

Penn played its home games at Franklin Field adjacent to the university's campus in Philadelphia, Pennsylvania.

Schedule

References

Penn
Penn Quakers football seasons
Ivy League football champion seasons
Penn Quakers football